The Bats people or the Batsbi, are Nakh-speaking Tushetians in the country of Georgia. They are also known as the Ts’ova-Tush (წოვათუშები) after the Ts’ova Gorge in the historic Georgian mountain region of Tusheti. The group should not be confused with the neighbouring Kists – also a Nakh-speaking people who live in the nearby Pankisi Gorge.

Language and customs
Part of the community still retains its own Bats language ("batsbur mott"), which has adopted many Georgian loan-words and grammatical rules and is mutually unintelligible with the two other Nakh languages, Chechen and Ingush. As Professor Johanna Nichols put it, "[the Batsbur] language is related to Chechen and Ingush roughly as Czech is related to Russian [and the Batsbi] not belong to vai naakh nor their language to vai mott, though any speaker of Chechen or Ingush can immediately tell that the language is closely related and can understand some phrases of it. The Batsbi have not traditionally followed Vainakh customs or law, and they consider themselves Georgians." Batsbur language is unwritten and the Batsbi have used Georgian as a language of literacy and trade for centuries.

The renowned Georgian ethnographer Sergi Makalatia wrote in his study of Tusheti that "the Tsova-Tush speak their own language, which is related to Chechen and Ingush. This language has, however, borrowed many words from Georgian; the Tsova-Tush speak it both at home and among each other. Everybody knows the Tsova language. It is shameful not to speak it. Children start speaking Tsova-Tush and learn Georgian later."

Nowadays, all Batsbi speak Georgian (usually with a Tushetian or Kakhetian accent). Only a handful speak Batsbur with any kind of proficiency.

The Batsbi have retained very little of their separate cultural traits, and their customs and traditions now resemble those of other Eastern Georgian mountaineers, particularly those of the Tush (obviously, but there are also deeper pagan-religious links between the Tush and the neighbouring Khevsur).

Origins 
According to most authors, the Batsbi are descended from the Ingushes. The origin of the Tsova-Tushins from the Ingush (Galgaï) was also acknowledged by the first Tsova-Tushino writer I. Tsiskarov. The data of the Ingush and Batsbi folk legends also testify that the Batsbi came from the area of Vabua in mountainous Ingushetia. This was confirmed by special studies at the beginning of the 20th century. According to some information, the resettlement of a part of the Ingush-Fyappins to Tusheti occurred at the end of the 16th century or at the beginning of the 17th century.

Tsovata and migration to Kakheti

The Batsbi's villages in the Ts'ova Gorge (Tsovata) were Ts'aro, Shavts'qala, Nazarta, Nadirta, Mozarta, Indurta, Sagirta and Etelta. Each was inhabited by one or several extended families who believed they shared a common ancestor. In the early nineteenth century, following the destruction of two of their villages by landslides and an outbreak of the plague, the Batsbi abandoned their eight villages in the Ts'ova Gorge in western Tusheti and began to migrate down to the lowlands on the left bank of the Alazani river in western Kakheti.

A significant proportion of the village's women work in Europe and in America, sending money home to the village. Many men still work as shepherds or cowherds, most of them wintering the animals in the Shiraki lowlands (south-eastern Georgia, on the border with neighbouring Azerbaijan) and then taking them up to summer pastures in Tusheti (a two- to three-week journey).

According to a study written and published by Professor Roland Topshishvili as part of the University of Frankfurt's ECLING project, the Batsbi only lived in temporary dwellings around Alvani in winter. In the summer, the men and their families would lead their flocks of sheep up to summer pastures around Tbatana and in Tsovata, returning to Alvani in the autumn.

Professor Johanna Nichols also wrote about the migration of the Batsbi in her article on "The Origin of the Chechen and Ingush":

Batsbi tradition as recorded by Desheriev (1953, 1963) preserves memory of a two-stage descent: first, abandonment of the original highland area in northern Tusheti, settling of villages lower in the mountains, and a period of transhumance plus permanent descents of a few families; then, complete abandonment of the highlands and year-round settlement in the lowlands after a flood destroyed one of the secondary mountain villages in the early nineteenth century. That is, Batsbi lowland outposts were established by a combination of transhumance and individual resettlements, and some time later there was a sizable migration into an established outpost.

Most of the Batsbi currently live in the village of Zemo ("Upper") Alvani in the eastern Georgian province of Kakheti, close to the town of Akhmeta (at the mouth of the Pankisi Gorge). Around half of Zemo Alvani's c.7,000 inhabitants are of Bats origin.

Historical population figures
The first reference to the Batsbi in European ethnographical literature is in the chapter on the Tush and Tusheti in Johannes Güldenstädt's Reisen durch Rußland und im Caucasischen Gebürge ["Travels through Russia and in the Mountains of the Caucasus"], published posthumously by Peter Simon Pallas between 1787 and 1791, although Güldenstädt does not mention them by name, merely pointing out instead that "Kistian and Georgian are spoken equally in the 4 first-named villages [in the Ts'ova Gorge]. Their inhabitants could also more easily be descendants of the Kists than the other Tush."

Figures from the Russian imperial census of 1873 given in Dr. Gustav Radde's Die Chews'uren und ihr Land — ein monographischer Versuch untersucht im Sommer 1876 include the Bats villages in the Ts'ova Gorge (dividing them into the "Indurta" and "Sagirta" communities):

 Indurta community: 191 households, consisting of 413 men and 396 women, totalling 809 souls
 Sagirta community: 153 households (Sagirta proper: 79; Ts'aro: 26; Etelta: 48), consisting of 372 men and 345 women, totalling 717 souls

1873 TOTAL: 344 households, consisting of 785 men and 741 women, in all 1,526 souls.

Dr. Radde adds:
"The members of [these two communities] have largely emigrated to the lowlands along the Alazani River, to the east of Akhmeta; they move up in summer to the rich pastures of Tbatana at the southern end of the Massara mountain range (see Itinerary), but still consider Indurta as their property and even leave 2-3 families living there in winter. [The Ts'ova Gorge is situated] By the north-western spring of the Tusheti Alazani River. [...] Together, these two communities made up the Ts'ova community until 1866."

The decline of the Bats/Tsova-Tush language

Concerning the slow decline of Batsbur as a language, Professor Topshishvili writes:

In the scientific literature, especially in the Soviet Russian ethnographic science great attention was paid to the marriage facts of people of different languages. Russians were greatly interested in russification of the people living in the Russian empire to make them speak Russian. In the Soviet Russian ethnographic literature (I. Bromlei and others) it is emphasized that the problems rise in the languages of small groups when the percentage of their daughters-in-law of different languages exceeds 15-20%. In this case, the language gradually faces the danger. In such families the children do not speak their fathers’ languages (especially when there do not live grandmother and grandfather in the family). The children start speaking their mothers’ language from the very beginning and speak it afterwards.

In this view, we got interested in the situation of the Tsova-Tushs at their compact dwelling place in the village Zemo (Upper) Alvani. In the local village board 398 married couples are officially registered. As it turned out, in the last 10-12 years, the considerable part of the married couples, because of different reasons (financial-economic conditions, moving registration center from village to the region center), are not registered officially. It appeared that, from the 398 couples only 226 are Tsova-Tushs. i.e. 226 Tush men’s wives are also Tsova- Tushs. That makes 56-57%. The rest men’s wives are aliens. The most of the latter are the women speaking Tush dialect of Georgian. There are also many women from the different villages of Kakheti region. Several Russian, Kist, Ossethian and Armenian women were also recorded. Thus, the percentage of those women in the Tsova families not speaking the Tsova-Tush language is 43,22%.

According to ethnographic data was proved that until the 60-70s of the 20th century, the most of the Tsova-Tush (Batsbis) men entered into marriage with Tsova-Tush women. Though, even then were not rare the facts of marrying women speaking Tush dialect of the Georgian language. (Many of them were also studying the Tsova-Tush language. By the way, the Tsova-Tush women married to Georgian-speaking men, often taught their language to their children) But it does not exceed the considerable limit. The above mentioned conjugal relations lasted until the time when the marriage matter was a competence of the parents. Since the parents do not interfere in marriage matters of their children and the young people decide their fate independently, the most Tsova-Tush men often find their partners in other villages. All this reasoned in the dying-out of the Tsova-Tush (Batsb) language. Only 25-30 years ago existing bilingual situation is disappearing and the most part of the population uses Georgian as the usual language. The fact is that, the most Tsova-Tushs (Batsbis) consider this event as quite normal and only some of them are very sorry for that, especially the old people.

It is also a remarkable fact that in disappearance of the Tsova-Tush (Batsb) language, the role of human factor should be eliminated. The indifference towards the above matter could be explained by their Georgian consciousness. They are the organic part of the Georgian nation and do not differ from other Georgians with their traditions, customs and habits and mentality.

References

Bibliography

External links
Batsav.Com, a site mainly dedicated to the Tsova-Tush with significant information on other Caucasian peoples.
YouTube, a video recording of a song in Batsbur.

People from Georgia (country) by ethnic or national origin
Nakh peoples